Bucculatrix pertusella is a moth in the family Bucculatricidae. It was described by Philipp Christoph Zeller in 1877 and is found in Colombia.

References

Bucculatricidae
Moths described in 1877
Taxa named by Philipp Christoph Zeller
Moths of South America